John Alden Dix (December 25, 1860 – April 9, 1928) was an American businessman and politician who served as 38th Governor of New York from January 1911 to January 1913.

A native of Glens Falls, New York, Dix attended Cornell University before becoming active in several Dix family business ventures.  He later expanded into the lumber and paper industries, where his success made him wealthy.

Dix became active in politics as a Democratic Party, and served terms as chairman of the Washington County Democratic Committee and the New York State Democratic Committee.  In 1908, Dix was an unsuccessful candidate for Lieutenant Governor of New York.

In 1910, Dix was the successful Democratic nominee for governor, and he served one two-year term, January 1911 to December 1912.  His term was largely concerned with issues of workplace safety in the wake of the Triangle Shirtwaist Factory fire.  In 1912, Dix ran for reelection, but lost the Democratic nomination to William Sulzer.

After leaving the governorship, Dix returned to management of his business interests.  In retirement he became a resident of Santa Barbara, California.  He died in New York City in 1928, and was buried in Albany, New York.

Life
Born in Glens Falls, New York, he was the son of James Lawton Dix (1816–1888) and his wife, Laura (née Stevens) Dix (1827–1893). His maternal great-grandparents, Ozias (1750–1835) and Lucy Hatch Dix (1752–1831), were first cousins. His second cousin, twice removed is Daniel H. Wells.

Dix graduated from Glens Falls Academy and attended Cornell University from 1879 to 1882. He was an initiated member of the Beta Charge of the Theta Delta Chi fraternity.

After college, Dix was employed in the Dix family businesses, including a quarry and a machine shop.  He then began a career as the owner of several businesses in the lumber and paper making industry, the success of which made him wealthy.

He married Gertrude Alden Thomson, the daughter of Albany lumber merchant Lemon Thomson, who was Dix's business partner. Gertrude's sister, Nancy Sherman Thomson (1867–1927), was married to State Senator Curtis N. Douglas (1856–1919).

Political career
Dix also became involved in politics, including serving as a delegate to the 1904 Democratic National Convention, and chairman of the Washington County and New York State Democratic Committees.  In 1906, he was an unsuccessful candidate for the Democratic nomination for governor at the party's state convention.

In 1908, Dix was the Democratic nominee for Lieutenant Governor of New York on the ticket with Lewis S. Chanler, but was defeated.

Dix ran for governor again in 1910; he won the Democratic nomination, and won the November general election.  During his term, Dix established a New York State Factory Commission to investigate factory conditions, a reaction to the Triangle Shirtwaist Factory fire; as a result of the commission's work, 32 worker safety laws were enacted by the legislature and approved by Dix.  After a fire destroyed a large portion of the state capitol building, Dix successfully advocated state legislation that improved fire safety regulations and building codes.

Other Dix accomplishments in office included creation of the state Conservation Commission, the law authorizing direct primary elections, and a law limiting work weeks to 54 hours.  In 1912 he was a delegate to the Democratic National Convention.  He also ran for reelection in 1912, but lost the Democratic nomination to William Sulzer.

Death and burial
After leaving office Dix retired to Santa Barbara, California.  He was also active in civic endeavors including service on the Cornell University board of trustees.  In 1912, he received the honorary degree of LL.D. from Hamilton College.

Mrs. Dix died in Santa Barbara in 1923; the couple had no children.

Dix died in New York City on April 9, 1928, and was buried at Albany Rural Cemetery in Menands.

The other Governor Dix
John Alden Dix had the same first and last name as Union General and Governor of New York John Adams Dix, and was often referred to in the press as a nephew or a first cousin once removed of John Adams Dix.  In fact, John Alden Dix had no known family relationship with John Adams Dix.

Trivia
Governor Dix planned to sail to Europe with his wife on April 20, 1912 aboard the RMS Titanic. For obvious reasons this journey was canceled.

References

1860 births
1928 deaths
Cornell University alumni
Democratic Party governors of New York (state)
American Episcopalians
Burials at Albany Rural Cemetery
New York State College of Forestry
Politicians from Glens Falls, New York